The 1934 Pahiatua earthquake struck at 11:46 pm on 5 March, causing severe damage in much of the lower North Island. Wairarapa, Wellington and Hawke's Bay (which was still recovering from the 1931 Hawke's Bay earthquake) felt the strongest levels of shaking, with much of New Zealand feeling the tremor.

This earthquake has historically been referred to as the Pahiatua earthquake, but recent reviews of its epicentre place it closer to the locality of Horoeka.

It was felt as far north as Auckland, and the shaking was also felt in the mainland of the northern South Island, and along the east coast as far as Dunedin. Destructive intensities of VIII (Severe) were experienced in an area that extended approximately 8700 km2 over most of the lower North Island, and reached a peak of IX (Violent) south-east of Pahiatua, between the small towns of Pongaroa and Bideford.

Tectonic setting
The eastern part of North Island lies on the Hikurangi Margin, where the Pacific Plate is subducting obliquely beneath the Australian Plate. The dextral (right lateral) component of the convergence is accommodated in the overlying plate by a series of dextral strike-slip faults, known as the North Island Fault System.

Earthquake characteristics
The earthquake had an estimated magnitude of 7.6 on the surface wave magnitude scale and 7.2–7.4 on the moment magnitude scale. The epicentre was originally assumed to be near Pahiatua, based on the severity of damage, but further analysis of seismograms from the event, the distribution of felt intensities and the location of aftershocks suggested that it was located near Horoeka. Results of trenching across the Waipukaka Fault suggests that this was the causative fault for the earthquake.

Damage
The earthquake was most severe in the Hawke's Bay and northern Wairarapa regions (now the Tararua District est. 1989), and caused widespread damage from Porangahau to Castlepoint. Much of this area, particularly towards the east coast, was sparsely populated at the time, but the shaking caused extensive damage in the town of Pahiatua, where a number of poorly constructed buildings were severely damaged or collapsed entirely. Two people with existing health problems died from heart failure, and one person sustained injuries that required hospitalisation. The movement also triggered numerous small landslides in the cliffs along the coast from Cape Turnagain to Castlepoint, and deformed the ground surface in a number of localities.

See also
 List of earthquakes in 1934
 List of earthquakes in New Zealand

Notes

Further reading
On the epicentre of the 1934 Pahiatua earthquake. KE Bullen – NZJ Sci. Tech, 1938
Downes, G., et al. "The 1934 Pahiatua earthquake sequence: analysis of observational and instrumental data." Bulletin of the New Zealand National Society for Earthquake Engineering 32.4 (1999): 221–245.
 Hamish Linn Wixon Earthquakes, architecture, and building control in Wellington 1978. ''''

External links

Pahiatua earthquake
1934 earthquakes
Earthquakes in New Zealand